Markopoulo may refer to places in Greece:

Markopoulo Mesogaias, a suburban town of Athens
Markopoulo, Elis, a small village in the municipal unit of Tragano, Elis
Markopoulo, Kefalonia, a village in the southeastern part of the island of Kefalonia
Markopoulo Oropou, a commune in the northeastern part of Athens near Oropos
Limin Markopoulou, or Porto Rafti, the port of Markopoulo Mesogaias